Cruise Planners is the nation’s largest home-based travel agent franchise network.  The company is headquartered in downtown Coral Springs, Florida. The company's travel agency franchisees specialize in booking luxury vacations, cruises, tours and travel to destinations around the world. The company has more than 2,500 franchise owners in all 50 states.

The company is a licensed travel agency, and a member of CLIA (Cruise Lines International Association), IFA (International Franchise Association), and ASTA (American Society of Travel Agents).

History 
The company was co-founded by Michelle Fee in 1994 in Coral Springs, Florida. Just prior to the retirement of the company's original co-founders Lynn Korn and Marvin Davis in 2007, their shares in the company were purchased by Palm Beach Capital.

In 2013, CEO Michelle Fee, the late COO Vicky Garcia and CFO Tom Kruszewski together purchased the company from Palm Beach Capital. In May of 2022, Michelle Fee became the sole owner of Cruise Planners. The company continues to be privately held, and has approximately 115 employees at the Home Office in Coral Springs, FL.

In September 2022, Cruise Planners announced it would join Signature Travel Network, one of the travel industry's largest travel agency networks.

Awards and recognition 
Cruise Planners is the most awarded travel franchise company in the industry. Franchise Business Review awarded Cruise Planners "Best in Category" in 2021, 2022 and 2023 and Cruise Planners has been listed on Entrepreneur’s Annual Franchise 500 List since 2004. 
Travel Weekly also named Cruise Planners #18 on their Annual Power List.

In 2019, the Broward County Commission proclaimed January 29th as "Cruise Planners Day" in recognition of the company's economic and positive impact on tourism and the community.

FRANCHISE AWARDS

Franchise Business Review
Top 200 Franchises (#3 Overall) 
Most Innovative Franchises
Best in Category (2021-2023)
Best Low-Cost Franchise
Top Franchises Culture
Best Franchises for Veterans
Top 50 Franchises for Women

Franchise Chatter
Best Travel Agency Franchise

Entrepreneur Magazine
Top 500 (2023)
 Frnachise 500 Hall of Fame (22 Years ranked)
 Top Travel Franchise for 18 years in a row
 Top 500 Low Cost Franchise to Own (2021)

LEADERSHIP AWARDS

Michelle Fee, CEO and Founder
EY Entrepreneur of the Year® Hospitality and Leisure, Florida
Executive of the Year – 2021 Travvy Awards
EY Entrepreneur of the Year® National Finalist
Power Leader – South Florida Business Journal
Ultimate CEO – by South Florida Business Journal
Florida 500 – Florida Trend
Most Innovative Executive – Travvy Awards
Cruise Lines International Association (CLIA) Hall of Fame honoree
The Leukemia & Lymphoma Society’s Woman of the Year in Fort Lauderdale
Godmother of AmaWaterways’ AmaSerena
Lifetime Achievement Award – Travel Weekly
Woman of Wonder – Franchise Dictionary 

Theresa Scalzitti, COO
Godmother of Atlas Ocean Voyages' World Traveller

Brian Shultz, CIO           
CIO of the Year 2019- South Florida Business Journal 
CIO of the Year Finalist 2016– South Florida Business Journal
40 Under 40 award recipient – South Florida Business Journal

Scott Koepf, Chief Strategy Officer
Lifetime Achievement Award and Inducted into the CLIA Hall of Fame (2021)
Travelage West Trendsetter Award – Industry Activist in support of Travel Agents (2015)
Past Chairman of the CLIA Starboard Advisory Board (2019 – 2022)
Past president of NACTA (National Association of Career Travel Agents)/ASTA Small Business Network) (2008 – 2010)
Past President of NACOA (National Association of Cruise Only Agencies) (1993 – 1995)

HOME OFFICE AWARDS

South Florida Top Workplaces – Sun Sentinel
Top Women-Owned Business – South Florida Business Journal
South Florida Fast 50 List – South Florida Business Journal
Home Office Team named Management Team of the Year – Silver Stevie Award
Top Community Involvement Program (CP Cares) – Travel Weekly Magellan Award
Fastest-growing private companies in America on the Inc. 5000 list – Inc. Magazine

MARKETING AND TECHNOLOGY (MARTECH) AWARDS

Gold- Overall Training Program (STARU)- Travel Weekly Magellan Award (2022)
Gold- Marketing-Social Media (CP Social)- Travel Weekly Magellan Award (2022)
Gold- Overall-Business Strategy (SOAR Dashboard)- Travel Weekly Magellan Award (2022)
Silver- Overall-Technology Solutions (CP Mobile + CP Maxx Mobile)- Travel Weekly Magellan Award (2022)
Hall of Fame Agency Innovator Award – Cruise Line International Association (CLIA)
FranTech Award for Innovation – International Franchise Association (IFA)
Best Travel Technology Provider – Travvy Awards
Innovation Award – Travel Weekly Magellan Award
Top Travel Innovation (CP Maxx, Alexa Skills and CP View) – Travel Weekly Magellan Award
Top Marketing Campaigns – Travel Weekly Magellan Award
Top Website – Travel Weekly Magellan Award
Top Website Marketing Campaign (CP Video Network) – Travel Weekly Magellan Award
Top Training Program (Cruisitude Academy) – Travel Weekly Magellan Award
Top Travel Innovation (Triggered Email Campaign) – Travel Weekly Magellan Award
Best Travel Technology – Travvy Awards
Marketing Partner of the Year – Norwegian Cruise Line

2018 inducted into the Cruise Lines International Association (CLIA) Hall of Fame as the Travel Agency Innovator of the year.
2019 Broward County Commission officially proclaimed January 29th as "Cruise Planners Day".

See also 
 List of top earning travel companies

References 

Travel agencies
American travel websites
Transport companies established in 1994
Travel and holiday companies of the United States
Privately held companies based in Florida
Franchises